Austin Gough is an American football Linebacker for the  Kentucky Wildcats.

References

Sportspeople from Owensboro, Kentucky
Living people

Year of birth missing (living people)